

Events
Phil D'Andrea is elected president of the Unione Siciliana, a Sicilian fraternal organization, in Chicago.
April 22 – Baby Face Nelson, hiding out with John Dillinger, at the Little Bohemia Lodge just outside Manitowish Waters, Wisconsin kills FBI Special Agent W. Carter Baum in a shootout.
Spring – Headed by Meyer Lansky and Johnny Torrio, organized crime leaders hold a conference at the Waldorf Astoria Hotel in New York to discuss the formation of a National Crime Syndicate.
July 2 – Paul Castellano is arrested for the armed robbery of a Hartford, Connecticut store. Sentenced to one year imprisonment in the Hartford County Jail, Castellano serves three months before being released in December.
July 22 – John Dillinger killed in Chicago by the FBI.
October – New York Mayor Fiorello La Guardia orders a police raid on gambling parlors.  This raid damages over 1,000 slot machines owned by mob boss Frank Costello.
October 9 – Ferdinand "The Shadow" Boccia is abducted by Willie Gallo and Ernest "The Hawk" Rupolo after a dispute with Vito Genovese over a fixed card game.  Boccia is later murdered.

Arts and literature
When the Kellys Rode (film) 
Jimmy the Gent (film)  starring James Cagney.

Births
November 6 – Isoji Koga, the founder of the Dojin-kai
Americo Petrillo "The Cigar", Patriarca crime family soldier and associate of William P. Grasso
Frank Salemme "Cadillac Frank", Patriarca crime family leader and former member of the Winter Hill Gang

Deaths
April 26 - John "Red" Hamilton, bank robber mortally wounded by police on April 23 in Minnesota and later died in Illinois
May 23 – Clyde Barrow, outlaw shot dead by Federal marshals
May 23 – Bonnie Parker, outlaw shot dead by Federal marshals
July 22 – John Dillinger, Public enemy #1 shot dead by the FBI
August 23 - Homer Van Meter, bank robber shot dead by police in St. Paul MN
September 22 - Charles Makley, bank robber shot by prison guards during an attempted escape from Ohio State Prison
October 9 – Ferdinand Boccia, New York mobster
October 17 - Harry Pierpont, bank robber executed by electric chair
October 22 -Charles Arthur Floyd, Public enemy #1 shot dead by the FBI
November 27 – Babyface Nelson, Public enemy #1 died from wounds suffered in a shootout with 2 FBI agents

References

Organized crime
Years in organized crime